This is a list of singles that reached number one on the Cash Box Top 100 Singles chart in 1991, presented in chronological order.

See also
1991 in music 
List of Hot 100 number-one singles of 1991 (U.S.)

References
https://web.archive.org/web/20080101114901/http://musicseek.info/no1hits/1991.htm
https://web.archive.org/web/20080501004335/http://cashboxmagazine.com/archives/90s_files/1991.html

1991
1991 record charts
1991 in American music